The Mundell Lowe Quartet is an album by American jazz guitarist Mundell Lowe that was released in 1955 by Riverside Records.

Reception

At AllMusic, Scott Yanow gave the album four stars and said, "Most of this set is essentially straight ahead bebop with guitarist Mundell Lowe heard in top form".

Track listing

Personnel 
 Mundell Lowe – guitar
 Dick Hyman – piano, organ, celesta
 Trigger Alpert – bass
 Ed Shaughnessy – drums

References 

1955 albums
Mundell Lowe albums
Albums produced by Orrin Keepnews
Riverside Records albums